Evelin Lanthaler (born 6 May 1991) is an Italian luger who has competed since 2007. A natural track luger, she won a silver medal in the women's singles event at the FIL European Luge Natural Track Championships 2010 in St. Sebastian, Austria.

References
FIL-Luge profile

External links 

 

1991 births
Living people
Italian female lugers
Italian lugers
People from Moos in Passeier
Sportspeople from Südtirol